Douglas Reginald Berry (3 May 1907 – 17 April 1957) was an Australian politician. Born in Esk, Queensland, he was educated at state schools and at Ipswich Technical College. He became a butcher, and eventually owned a chain of butcher's shops. In 1949, he was elected to the Australian House of Representatives as the Liberal member for Griffith, defeating Labor MP William Conelan. He held the seat until his defeat in 1954. Berry died in 1957.

References

Liberal Party of Australia members of the Parliament of Australia
Members of the Australian House of Representatives for Griffith
Members of the Australian House of Representatives
1907 births
1957 deaths
20th-century Australian politicians